The members of the New Jersey Legislature are chosen from 40 electoral districts. Each district elects one Senator and two Assemblymen.

New Jersey is one of only seven states with nested state legislative districts, in which two or more state House are coextensive with a single state Senate seat. In New Jersey, each district elects one Senator and two Assembly members. (States that have similar practices are Arizona, Idaho, Maryland, North Dakota, South Dakota, and Washington.)

Districts are reapportioned decennially by the New Jersey Apportionment Commission following each United States Census, as provided by Article IV, Section III of the state Constitution.

The most recent changes to the legislative districts were in effect in the primary elections held in June 2011 and the general elections of November 2011, following the 2010 United States Census.

District 1

Avalon Borough,
Cape May City,
Cape May Point Borough,
Commercial Township,
Corbin City,
Dennis Township,
Downe Township,
Estell Manor City,
Fairfield Township (Cumberland),
Greenwich Township (Cumberland),
Hopewell Township (Cumberland),
Lawrence Township (Cumberland),
Lower Township,
Maurice River Township,
Middle Township,
Millville City,
North Wildwood City,
Ocean City,
Sea Isle City,
Shiloh Borough,
Stone Harbor Borough,
Stow Creek Township,
Upper Township,
Vineland City,
West Cape May Borough,
West Wildwood Borough,
Weymouth Township,
Wildwood City,
Wildwood Crest Borough,
Woodbine Borough

District 2

Absecon City,
Atlantic City,
Brigantine City,
Buena Borough,
Buena Vista Township,
Egg Harbor City,
Egg Harbor Township,
Folsom Borough,
Hamilton Township (Atlantic),
Linwood City,
Longport Borough,
Margate City,
Mullica Township,
Northfield City,
Pleasantville City,
Somers Point City,
Ventnor City

District 3

Alloway Township,
Bridgeton City,
Carneys Point Township,
Clayton Borough,
Deerfield Township,
East Greenwich Township,
Elk Township,
Elmer Borough,
Elsinboro Township,
Franklin Township (Gloucester),
Glassboro Borough,
Greenwich Township (Gloucester),
Logan Township,
Lower Alloways Creek Township,
Mannington Township,
National Park Borough,
Newfield Borough,
Oldmans Township,
Paulsboro Borough,
Penns Grove Borough,
Pennsville Township,
Pilesgrove Township,
Pittsgrove Township,
Quinton Township,
Salem City,
South Harrison Township,
Swedesboro Borough,
Upper Deerfield Township,
Upper Pittsgrove Township,
West Deptford Township,
Woodbury Heights Borough,
Woodstown Borough,
Woolwich Township

District 4

Chesilhurst Borough,
Clementon Borough,
Gloucester Township,
Laurel Springs Borough,
Lindenwold Borough,
Monroe Township (Gloucester),
Pitman Borough,
Washington Township (Gloucester),
Winslow Township

District 5

Audubon Borough,
Audubon Park Borough,
Barrington Borough,
Bellmawr Borough,
Brooklawn Borough,
Camden City,
Deptford Township,
Gloucester City,
Haddon Heights Borough,
Harrison Township,
Lawnside Borough,
Magnolia Borough,
Mantua Township,
Mount Ephraim Borough,
Runnemede Borough,
Wenonah Borough,
Westville Borough,
Woodbury City,
Woodlynne Borough

District 6

Berlin Township,
Cherry Hill Township,
Collingswood Borough,
Gibbsboro Borough,
Haddon Township,
Haddonfield Borough,
Hi-Nella Borough,
Maple Shade Township,
Merchantville Borough,
Oaklyn Borough,
Pennsauken Township,
Somerdale Borough,
Stratford Borough,
Tavistock Borough,
Voorhees Township

District 7

Beverly City,
Bordentown City,
Bordentown Township,
Burlington City,
Burlington Township,
Cinnaminson Township,
Delanco Township,
Delran Township,
Edgewater Park Township,
Fieldsboro Borough,
Florence Township,
Moorestown Township,
Mount Laurel Township,
Palmyra Borough,
Riverside Township,
Riverton Borough,
Willingboro Township

District 8

Berlin Borough,
Eastampton Township,
Evesham Township,
Hainesport Township,
Hammonton Town,
Lumberton Township,
Mansfield Township (Burlington),
Medford Lakes Borough,
Medford Township,
Mount Holly Township,
Pemberton Borough,
Pemberton Township,
Pine Hill Borough,
Shamong Township,
Southampton Township,
Springfield Township (Burlington),
Waterford Township,
Westampton Township,
Woodland Township

District 9

Barnegat Light Borough,
Barnegat Township,
Bass River Township,
Beach Haven Borough,
Beachwood Borough,
Berkeley Township,
Eagleswood Township,
Galloway Township,
Harvey Cedars Borough,
Lacey Township,
Little Egg Harbor Township,
Long Beach Township,
Ocean Gate Borough,
Ocean Township (Ocean),
Pine Beach Borough,
Port Republic City,
Seaside Park Borough,
Ship Bottom Borough,
South Toms River Borough,
Stafford Township,
Surf City Borough,
Tabernacle Township,
Tuckerton Borough,
Washington Township (Burlington)

District 10

Bay Head Borough,
Brick Township,
Island Heights Borough,
Lakehurst Borough,
Lavallette Borough,
Manchester Township,
Mantoloking Borough,
Point Pleasant Beach Borough,
Seaside Heights Borough,
Toms River Township

District 11

Allenhurst Borough,
Asbury Park City,
Colts Neck Township,
Deal Borough,
Eatontown Borough,
Freehold Borough,
Freehold Township,
Interlaken Borough,
Loch Arbour Village,
Long Branch City,
Neptune City Borough,
Neptune Township,
Ocean Township (Monmouth),
Red Bank Borough,
Shrewsbury Borough,
Shrewsbury Township,
Tinton Falls Borough,
West Long Branch Borough

District 12

Allentown Borough,
Chesterfield Township,
Englishtown Borough,
Jackson Township,
Manalapan Township,
Matawan Borough,
Millstone Township,
New Hanover Township,
North Hanover Township,
Old Bridge Township,
Plumsted Township,
Roosevelt Borough,
Upper Freehold Township,
Wrightstown Borough

District 13

Aberdeen Township,
Atlantic Highlands Borough,
Fair Haven Borough,
Hazlet Township,
Highlands Borough,
Holmdel Township,
Keansburg Borough,
Keyport Borough,
Little Silver Borough,
Marlboro Township,
Middletown Township,
Monmouth Beach Borough,
Oceanport Borough,
Rumson Borough,
Sea Bright Borough,
Union Beach Borough

District 14

Cranbury Township,
East Windsor Township,
Hamilton Township (Mercer),
Hightstown Borough,
Jamesburg Borough,
Monroe Township (Middlesex),
Plainsboro Township,
Robbinsville Township (known as Washington Township until 2007),
Spotswood Borough

District 15

East Amwell Township,
Ewing Township,
Hopewell Borough,
Hopewell Township (Mercer),
Lambertville City,
Lawrence Township (Mercer),
Pennington Borough,
Trenton City,
West Amwell Township,
West Windsor Township

District 16

Branchburg Township,
Delaware Township (Hunterdon),
Flemington Borough,
Hillsborough Township,
Manville Borough,
Millstone Borough,
Montgomery Township,
Princeton (Princeton Borough and Princeton Township merged on Jan. 1, 2013),
Raritan Township,
Readington Township,
Rocky Hill Borough,
Somerville Borough,
South Brunswick Township,
Stockton Borough

District 17

Franklin Township (Somerset),
Milltown Borough,
New Brunswick City,
North Brunswick Township,
Piscataway Township

District 18

East Brunswick Township,
Edison Township,
Helmetta Borough,
Highland Park Borough,
Metuchen Borough,
South Plainfield Borough,
South River Borough,

District 19

Carteret Borough,
Perth Amboy City,
Sayreville Borough,
South Amboy City,
Woodbridge Township

District 20

Elizabeth City,
Hillside Township,
Roselle Borough,
Union Township (Union)

District 21

Berkeley Heights Township,
Bernards Township,
Chatham Borough,
Cranford Township,
Far Hills Borough,
Garwood Borough,
Kenilworth Borough,
Long Hill Township,
Mountainside Borough,
New Providence Borough,
Roselle Park Borough,
Springfield Township (Union),
Summit City,
Warren Township,
Watchung Borough,
Westfield Town

District 22

Clark Township,
Dunellen Borough,
Fanwood Borough,
Green Brook Township,
Linden City,
Middlesex Borough,
North Plainfield Borough,
Plainfield City,
Rahway City,
Scotch Plains Township,
Winfield Township

District 23

Alexandria Township,
Alpha Borough,
Bedminster Township,
Bethlehem Township,
Bloomsbury Borough,
Bound Brook Borough,
Bridgewater Township,
Califon Borough,
Clinton Town,
Clinton Township,
Franklin Township (Hunterdon),
Franklin Township (Warren),
Frenchtown Borough,
Glen Gardner Borough,
Greenwich Township (Warren),
Hackettstown Town,
Hampton Borough,
Harmony Township,
High Bridge Borough,
Holland Township,
Kingwood Township,
Lebanon Borough,
Lebanon Township,
Lopatcong Township,
Mansfield Township (Warren),
Milford Borough,
Peapack-Gladstone Borough,
Phillipsburg Town,
Pohatcong Township,
Raritan Borough,
South Bound Brook Borough,
Tewksbury Township,
Union Township (Hunterdon),
Washington Borough,
Washington Township (Warren)

District 24

Allamuchy Township,
Andover Borough,
Andover Township,
Belvidere Town,
Blairstown Township,
Branchville Borough,
Byram Township,
Frankford Township,
Franklin Borough,
Fredon Township,
Frelinghuysen Township,
Green Township,
Hamburg Borough,
Hampton Township,
Hardwick Township,
Hardyston Township,
Hopatcong Borough,
Hope Township,
Independence Township,
Knowlton Township,
Lafayette Township,
Liberty Township,
Montague Township,
Mount Olive Township,
Newton Town,
Ogdensburg Borough,
Oxford Township,
Sandyston Township,
Sparta Township,
Stanhope Borough,
Stillwater Township,
Sussex Borough,
Vernon Township,
Walpack Township,
Wantage Township,
White Township

District 25

Bernardsville Borough,
Boonton Town,
Boonton Township,
Chester Borough,
Chester Township,
Denville Township,
Dover Town,
Mendham Borough,
Mendham Township,
Mine Hill Township,
Morris Township,
Morristown Town,
Mount Arlington Borough,
Mountain Lakes Borough,
Netcong Borough,
Randolph Township,
Rockaway Borough,
Roxbury Township,
Victory Gardens Borough,
Washington Township (Morris),
Wharton Borough

District 26

Butler Borough,
Fairfield Township (Essex),
Jefferson Township,
Kinnelon Borough,
Lincoln Park Borough,
Montville Township,
Morris Plains Borough,
North Caldwell Borough,
Parsippany-Troy Hills Township,
Rockaway Township,
Verona Township,
West Caldwell Township,
West Milford Township

District 27

Caldwell Borough,
Chatham Township,
East Hanover Township,
Essex Fells Township,
Florham Park Borough,
Hanover Township,
Harding Township,
Livingston Township,
Madison Borough,
Maplewood Township,
Millburn Township,
Roseland Borough,
South Orange Village Township,
West Orange Township

District 28

Bloomfield Township,
Glen Ridge Township,
Irvington Township,
Newark City (partial),
Nutley Township

District 29

Belleville Township,
Newark City (partial)

District 30

Avon-by-the-Sea Borough,
Belmar Borough,
Bradley Beach Borough,
Brielle Borough,
Farmingdale Borough,
Howell Township,
Lake Como Borough,
Lakewood Township,
Manasquan Borough,
Point Pleasant Borough,
Sea Girt Borough,
Spring Lake Borough,
Spring Lake Heights Borough,
Wall Township

District 31

Bayonne,
Jersey City (partial)

District 32

East Newark Borough,
Edgewater Borough,
Fairview Borough (Bergen),
Guttenberg Town,
Harrison Town,
Kearny Town,
North Bergen Township,
Secaucus Town,
West New York Town

District 33

Hoboken City,
Jersey City (partial),
Union City,
Weehawken Township

District 34

City of Orange Township,
Clifton City,
East Orange City,
Montclair Township

District 35

Elmwood Park Borough,
Garfield City,
Haledon Borough,
North Haledon Borough,
Paterson City,
Prospect Park Borough

District 36

Carlstadt Borough,
Cliffside Park Borough,
East Rutherford Borough,
Little Ferry Borough,
Lyndhurst Township,
Moonachie Borough,
North Arlington Borough,
Passaic City,
Ridgefield Borough,
Ridgefield Park Village,
Rutherford Borough,
South Hackensack Township,
Teterboro Borough,
Wallington Borough,
Wood-Ridge Borough

District 37

Alpine Borough,
Bogota Borough,
Cresskill Borough,
Englewood City,
Englewood Cliffs Borough,
Fort Lee Borough,
Hackensack City,
Leonia Borough,
Northvale Borough,
Palisades Park Borough,
Rockleigh Borough,
Teaneck Township,
Tenafly Borough

District 38

Bergenfield Borough,
Fair Lawn Borough,
Glen Rock Borough,
Hasbrouck Heights Borough,
Hawthorne Borough,
Lodi Borough,
Maywood Borough,
New Milford Borough,
Oradell Borough,
Paramus Borough,
River Edge Borough,
Rochelle Park Township,
Saddle Brook Township

District 39

Bloomingdale Borough,
Closter Borough,
Demarest Borough,
Dumont Borough,
Emerson Borough,
Harrington Park Borough,
Haworth Borough,
Hillsdale Borough,
Mahwah Township,
Montvale Borough,
Norwood Borough,
Oakland Borough,
Old Tappan Borough,
Park Ridge Borough,
Ramsey Borough,
Ringwood Borough,
River Vale Township,
Saddle River Borough,
Upper Saddle River Borough,
Wanaque Borough,
Washington Township (Bergen),
Westwood Borough,
Woodcliff Lake Borough,

District 40

Allendale Borough,
Cedar Grove Township,
Franklin Lakes Borough,
Ho-Ho-Kus Borough,
Little Falls Township,
Midland Park Borough,
Pequannock Township,
Pompton Lakes Borough,
Ridgewood Village,
Riverdale Borough,
Totowa Borough,
Waldwick Borough,
Wayne Township,
Woodland Park Borough (formerly West Paterson),
Wyckoff Township

References

External links
New Jersey Legislature Web Site

Politics of New Jersey
New Jersey legislative districts
2011 New Jersey elections
2012 New Jersey elections